"Ar Hyd y Nos" is a Welsh song sung to a tune that was first recorded in Edward Jones' Musical and Poetical Relics of the Welsh Bards (1784). The most commonly sung Welsh lyrics were written by John Ceiriog Hughes (1832-1887), and have been translated into several languages, including English (most famously by Harold Boulton (1859–1935)) and Breton. One of the earliest English versions, to different Welsh lyrics by one John Jones, was by Thomas Oliphant in 1862.

The melody is also used in the hymns "Go My Children With My Blessing” (1983), “God That Madest Earth and Heaven” (1827) and "Father in your Love Enfold Us".

The song is highly popular with traditional Welsh male voice choirs, and is sung by them at festivals in Wales and around the world.

The song is also sometimes considered a Christmas carol, and as such has been performed by many artists on Christmas albums, including Olivia Newton-John and Michael McDonald, who sang it as a duet on Newton-John's 2007 album Christmas Wish.
Cerys Matthews sang it solo on her 2010 album Tir.

Lyrics

Singable English lyrics to the same tune were written by Sir Harold Boulton in 1884:

Variations
There is evidence that the song has undergone the folk process to some degree, yielding several similar but modified versions. In one alternative version, the second verse is substituted with:

Another alternative version features a more neutral, night song text:

Yet another alternative version of the second verse is as follows:

A. G. Prys-Jones wrote a more literal but still singable and rhyming version:

The tune is also used in the hymn "For the Fruit of All Creation" by Fred Pratt Green. The first verse of Green's lyrics (used widely in the harvest season and at Thanksgiving) ends with these words: "For the plowing, sowing, reaping, silent growth while we are sleeping, / Future needs in earth's safekeeping, thanks be to God."

In popular culture

In music
 Joseph Haydn wrote a collection of Welsh folk songs for George Thomson (1757-1831) one of which is based on Ar hyd y nos (The Live Long Night) 
Ferdinand Ries used the tune and variations upon it in Ouverture bardique (WoO 24, 1815).
English composer Cyril Scott used the tune for the first of his three British Melodies for piano (1912).
The doo-wop group The Mystics, in the line-up that included Paul Simon (then recording as Jerry Landis) had a hit with a sped-up version.
Peter, Paul and Mary sing a version on their children's album Peter, Paul and Mommy.
 The chorus of Max Boyce's song "Hymns and Arias", frequently sung by fans of the Wales rugby union team, mentions "Ar Hyd y Nos": "And we were singing hymns and arias; 'Land of my Fathers', 'Ar hyd y nos'".
Alan Stivell sings the song in Breton, Welsh and English on his 23rd album Emerald.
The Kingston Trio sing a version on their holiday album The Last Month of the Year.

In film
The film Knowing, starring Nicolas Cage, features his character's wife singing the English version of the song to their child.
An a cappella version of the song occurs very briefly at the end of the Vulcan/Volcano scene in Terry Gilliam's film, The Adventures of Baron Munchausen, (1988) as Vulcan kisses Venus. It is assumed that the Cyclopes/miners are the singers.
Carter Burwell's soundtrack to the film, The General's Daughter, features a version of the tune played on a glockenspiel.
In the 1945 film version of Emlyn Williams' The Corn Is Green, the children in the school are taught the English version.
In the 1949 British Ealing comedy film, A Run for Your Money, starring Donald Houston, the song is sung at the Amateur Night performance and also heard as a theme on the train journey home.
The song is used in the 1940 film The Proud Valley, starring Paul Robeson.

In television
The TV movie A Child's Christmas in Wales features the family singing the song towards the end of the film, but in English.
In season 3 of the series Angel, the character Daniel Holtz is frequently heard singing the English version of this song.
In the episode "Thursday's Child" in season 5 of Road to Avonlea, Alec King (played by Cedric Smith) sings the English version of this song to his son Daniel. However, the lullaby applies to everyone else awake in the household, given the recent bout of tuberculosis in the youngest daughter, Cecily, which has thrown the family into crisis.
In Season 1, Episode 3 "Denial, Anger, Acceptance" of HBO's popular television show The Sopranos, Meadow Soprano and her choir sing the English version of the song, intercut with the mock execution of Christopher Moltisanti, and the real execution of Brendan Filone.
 In Series Two, Episode 26 of Monty Python's Flying Circus, the first two lines of the Welsh version are heard as an opening to a sketch about Welsh coal miners.
 In Season Three, Episode 14 of Shining Time Station, Stacy Forgets Her Name, Grace and Rex in the Jukebox Band sing the first section of their lullaby medley to help Stacy Jones who has lost her memory.
In season 2, episode 4 of the American television series The Alienist, nurse Libby Hatch is humming the melody as she is seen lying next to the Matron she just killed.

In video games
Chapter IV of the 2015 video game The Order: 1886 features the Sir Harold Boulton lyrics of the folk song on a collectible wax cylinder in the psychiatric ward of the Royal London Hospital.

Sheet music gallery

See also 
Christian child's prayer § Lullabies
List of Christmas carols

References

External links 

 
 Verse and prose translations

Welsh folk songs
Christmas carols
Glen Campbell songs
Peter, Paul and Mary songs
Lullabies